The 1929 Carnegie Tech Tartans football team represented the Carnegie Institute of Technology (now known as Carnegie Mellon University) in the 1929 college football season. In Walter Steffen's 15th year as head coach, the Tartans compiled a 5–3–1 record, and outscored their opponents 145 to 92.  Carnegie Tech played a tough schedule, facing two recognized national champions, Notre Dame (consensus) and Pittsburgh (Davis), along with a 10–2 USC team.  They shut out three opponents, were shut out once, and played Washington & Jefferson to a scoreless tie.

Schedule

References

Carnegie Tech
Carnegie Mellon Tartans football seasons
Carnegie Tech Tartans football